Guardian Tales is a 2020 action role-playing video game developed by Kong Studios and published by the South Korean publisher Kakao Games. The game initially soft-launched in parts of Southeast Asia on February 24, 2020 for iOS and Android and then officially on July 28, 2020 for the rest of the world. A Chinese version published by Bilibili was released on April 27, 2021, and a Japanese version self-published by Kong Studios, in collaboration with Shanghai Yostar, was released on October 6, 2021. A port for the Nintendo Switch was initially announced on May 2021 and scheduled for release on the later half of the same year, but was quietly delayed to October 4, 2022.

The game tells the story of the Guardian Knight, a newly recruited member of the Guardians, Kanterbury Kingdom's royal guard. After completing his/her first training as a Guardian, the Guardian Knight is confronted with a horde of enemies named "The Invaders" who want to rule the world. Guardian Tales was positively received by critics and players, praised for its creativity and evocations of classic JRPGs.

Gameplay
Players control the Guardian Knight (or another 'hero' in the next level if desired) in a top-down view. The game features joystick controls on the bottom right and left of the screen. Players have to fight some enemies if they want to go to the next area in the level, using all tactics and running to lure the enemy to the desired area, but the player will be 'locked' in an area if the battle is not over. Players will also be able to unlock new heroes throughout the game, as well as acquire new weapons by opening a box or finding a hidden location. The player initially camped in a forest for rest and treatment after completing a stage, but after completing Chapter 1, the player landed in Heavenhold, an airfield operated by Innkeeper Loraine at their residence. Players can also Summon a Hero by using the Gems for each attempt. Players can also join a Guild with other players, which will open a Raid mode that targets 4 bosses, each with a drop of useful items, exp, or gold.

After unlocking Heavenhold, players are also featured with other game modes such as Colosseum and Multiplayer, which includes Arena and Co-op. In Colosseum mode, players will risk 4 Heroes to fight 4 Hero opponents, the match takes place automatically but players can rearrange their position before the fight. While in Arena, players will control only one Hero from three and will compete with Hero opponents online, if the Hero loses, the player will be replaced with the second and third Hero until the last Hero loses. In the Kama-Zone mode, players perform the same as in the Colosseum, but will go up level by level to the boss level. Co-op mode was added during Lunar New Year in 2021, featuring 4-player dungeon rush levels.

Plot
The Guardian Knight (the player can name his/her character and choose their gender, although in context to the story female gender appears to be canon) is a knight of Kanterbury who has just joined the Guardians of Kanterbury Kingdom. Guardians who had just finished training with other members were informed that they had been attacked. Led by Captain Eva, the Knight and others rushed to the front gate of the castle in defence against the Invaders' attack. But as they fend off the Invaders' attack, a giant fireball falls on them causing the Guardian Knight to be thrown away but is rescued by a mysterious stranger. With the front gate of the palace broken, a horde of Invaders came and attacked the capital of the Kingdom. The Guardian manages to fight the Invader frontline, rescuing his friends Bob and Linda as well as reuniting with Captain Eva. After a minor scuffle with a Minotaur, the Knight and Eva manage to defeat it and return to the Palace to meet with the Princess and Queen Camilla. With Camilla finished evacuating the people to a safe place, the main antagonist (only referred to as the "Dark Magician" in the prologue) appears and knocks out the three outlying the Princess. With her survival, she managed to freeze the Magician in place; the four of them then started to leave but were attacked again by the escaped Dark Magician. While escaping, the antagonist manages to strike Eva and Camilla before the Knight and the Princess fall into the outskirts of Kanterbury's forests. The adventure begins with their quest to escape while finding a way to free Kanterbury from the clutches of the Invaders.

Reception

Zach Guida of Hardcore Droid said "The game works very well in combining JRPG characters, humor, and story elements with the dungeon game". Catherine Ng Dellosa of Pocket Gamer thinks "Overall, Guardian Tales needs your full attention, and it's not something you can play every time you need to take a break.", giving this game 4.5 out of 5 stars overall. Refluxxy from GamerBraves states that "The games found in Guardian Tales are reminiscent of old RPG games such as the classic The Legend of Zelda Game Boy series in the sense that you fight enemies as well as solve puzzles to progress through the levels."

The game also noted as the driving factor for Kakao's revenue increase, citing that the COVID-19 pandemic makes the online services becoming more prevalent. Guardian Tales have over 3 million of players globally during November 2020.

References

External links
 Official website

2020 video games
Action role-playing video games
Puzzle video games
Multiplayer video games
Cooperative video games
Android (operating system) games
IOS games
Video games developed in South Korea
Kakao Games games